Cian O'Riordan (born 1983) is an Irish Gaelic footballer who plays for club side Mallow. He has also lined out with divisional side Avondhu and at inter-county level with the Cork senior football team. He usually lines out in the forwards.

Career statistics

Club

Honours

Mallow
Cork Premier Intermediate Football Championship: 2007, 2017

Cork
Munster Under-21 Football Championship: 2004

References

1983 births
Living people
Mallow Gaelic footballers
Avondhu Gaelic footballers
Cork inter-county Gaelic footballers
People from Mallow, County Cork